Bragebreen is a glacier at Nordaustlandet, Svalbard. It is located at the mouth of Wahlenbergfjorden between the headlands of Brageneset and Idunneset. Bragebreen is a glacier stream from the large icecap Vestfonna.

References

Glaciers of Nordaustlandet